NPM Group (originally called Novosibirskprodmash) is a producer of equipment for fast foam-free dispensing of foamy beverages and milk vending machines. The company was founded in Novosibirsk in 1997.

History
The company was founded in Novosibirsk in 1997 and was originally called Novosibirskprodmash.

Brands

Pegas
Pegas is an apparatus for fast foam-free dispensing of foamy beverages (beer and others). It is installed in retail outlets. Its operation principle is based on the back pressure: the bottle is filled with a gas, then the beer squeezes it out of the container. Beer is fed into the bottle under pressure, and the back pressure in the bottle pushes and extinguishes the foam. This method had already been followed in industrial production, however, the company patented seven devices that operate on the basis of back pressure.

Counterfeiting devices
The company's devices were often tampered with by unscrupulous manufacturers from China. According to Sergei Buchik, he lost 15% of sales due to Chinese counterfeits in 2010.

MilkBox
MilkBoxes are milk vending machines disseminated in Novisibirsk, Novosibirsk Oblast and Yekaterinburg (as of 2016).

Export
The company exports its products to Europe, CIS, China, North and South America.

Revenue
2010
 Revenue – 1.2 billion rubles.

2015
 Revenue – 615 million rubles;
 Net profit – 105.9 million rubles.

References

Manufacturing companies based in Novosibirsk
Russian companies established in 1997
Vending machine manufacturers